TPS Foot was a French sports channel that was dedicated to airing football matches and was owned by French satellite provider TPS.

The channel began its programs on 13 August 2005 via the TPS package and on certain cable networks. TPS Foot stopped its live broadcast on 31 December 2007.

Programming
TPS Foot featured football matches from all the top leagues and competitions including:

FA Premier League (0 live games)
Bundesliga (German 1st Division) along with TPS Star
Serie A (1 or 2 live games per week) along with TPS Star
La Liga (Spanish 1st Division) (1 live game per week)
Football League Championship (English 2nd Division)
UEFA Cup
UEFA Champions League
 International friendlies
Copa Libertadores

TPS Foot also aired programming from Barça TV, Chelsea TV, MUTV and Real Madrid TV.

Other than that, TPS Foot showed both the preview and review for the Bundesliga and the FA Premier League.

External links
 

Defunct television channels in France
Television channels and stations established in 2005
Television channels and stations disestablished in 2007
2005 establishments in France
2007 disestablishments in France
Sports television networks in France
Mass media in Paris